Sincerely, Future Pollution is the sixth studio album by Canadian band Timber Timbre, released on April 7, 2017, on City Slang Records. In January 2017, the band released the first single from the album: "Sewer Blues". The second single, "Velvet Gloves & Spit", was released on February 15, 2017.

Track listing

Charts

References

2017 albums
Timber Timbre albums
Arts & Crafts Productions albums
City Slang albums